Baalshillem I (also transliterated Baalchillem, meaning "recompense of Baal"; , known in Greek as Sakton) was a Phoenician King of Sidon ( – ), and a vassal of the Achaemenid Empire. He was succeeded by his son Abdamun to the throne of Sidon.

Etymology 
The name Baalshillem is the Latinized form of the Phoenician  (BʿLŠLM), meaning "recompense of Baal". Alternative spellings of the king's name include Baalchillem.

Chronology 
The absolute chronology of the kings of Sidon from the dynasty of Eshmunazar I onward has been much discussed in the literature; traditionally placed in the course of the fifth century, inscriptions of this dynasty have been dated back to an earlier period on the basis of numismatic, historical and archaeological evidence. The most complete work addressing the dates of the reigns of these Sidonian kings is by the French historian Josette Elayi who shifted away from the use of biblical chronology. Elayi used all the available documentation of the time and included inscribed Tyrian seals and stamps excavated by the Lebanese archaeologist Maurice Chehab in 1972 from Jal el-Bahr, a neighborhood in the north of Tyre, ⁣ Phoenician inscriptions discovered by the French archaeologist Maurice Dunand in Sidon in 1965, and the systematic study of Sidonian coins which were the first coins to bear minting dates in antiquity based on the years of reign of the Sidonian kings.

Baalshillem I was the first among Sidonian monarchs to mark coins with issuing dates corresponding with the years of his reign as of year 30 which corresponds to 372 BC. Elayi established that Baalshillem I's year of accession was 450 BC and that he reigned until 426 BC.

Historical context 
In 539 BC, Phoenicia fell under the Achaemenid rule; it was divided into four vassal kingdoms: Sidon, Tyre, Byblos and Arwad. Eshmunazar I, a priest of Astarte and the founder of his namesake dynasty was enthroned King of Sidon around the time of the Achaemenid conquest of the Levant.  During the first phase of Achaemenid rule, Sidon flourished and reclaimed its former standing as Phoenicia's chief city. In the mid 5th century BC, Eshmunazar's dynasty was succeeded by that of Baalshillem I; this dynastic turnover coincides with the time by which Sidon began to independently mint its own coinage bearing the images of its reigning kings.

Epigraphic and numismatic sources 

The name of Baalshillem I is known from a votive statue of a "temple boy" offered to Eshmun, the Phoenician god of healing, by the great-grandson of King Ballshillem I, his namesake Ballshillem II. The base of the Baalshillem temple boy statue bears a Phoenician inscription known as KAI 281. The inscription reads:

The statue is of note because its inscription provides the names of four kings of Sidon from the Baalshillem I dynasty. The statue also represents the young future king Abdashtart I, who may have been five or six months of age at the time of the dedication of the statue.

Baalshillem I is also known from the coins he struck under his reign. The coins dating from the reign of the Baalshillem I dynasty show the abbreviated names of the respective kings, a custom of the Sidonian royalty. King Baalshillem I's name is abbreviated as B. The obverse of the coins of Baalshillem I usually showed a galley in front of Sidonian wall fortifications.

Genealogy 
Baalshillem I's dynasty succeeded that of Eshmunazar I; his heir was his son Abdamun.

See also 
 King of Sidon — A list of the ancient rulers of the city of Sidon

Notes

References

Bibliography 
 
 
 
 
 
 
 
 
 
 
 
 
 
 
 
 
 
 
 
 

5th-century BC rulers
Kings of Sidon
Rulers in the Achaemenid Empire
5th-century BC Phoenician people